Atlético Rio Negro Clube, commonly known as Rio Negro, is a Brazilian football club based in Boa Vista, Roraima, Roraima state. They competed in the Copa do Brasil once.

History
The club was founded on April 26, 1971. Rio Negro won the Campeonato Roraimense in 1991 and in 2000. They competed in the Copa do Brasil in 2001, when they were eliminated in the First Round by São Raimundo-AM.

Achievements

 Campeonato Roraimense:
 Winners (2): 1991, 2000

Stadium
Atlético Rio Negro Clube play their home games at Estádio Flamarion Vasconcelos, nicknamed Canarinho. The stadium has a maximum capacity of 6,000 people.

References

Football clubs in Roraima
Association football clubs established in 1971
1971 establishments in Brazil